Jack C. Capuano Jr. (born July 7, 1966) is an American ice hockey coach and former player. He is a former head coach of the New York Islanders of the National Hockey League (NHL). He is currently an associate coach for the Ottawa Senators of the National Hockey League (NHL). Capuano played as a defenseman and spent parts of three seasons in the NHL in the late 1980s and early 1990s. He is the older brother of former NHL hockey player Dave Capuano.

Playing career
Capuano played high school hockey at the Kent School in Kent, Connecticut and was a 5th round selection (88th overall) in the 1984 NHL Entry Draft. He played his college hockey at the University of Maine. At Maine, he was a teammate of his younger brother Dave Capuano and played on the same blueline as future NHLers Eric Weinrich and Bob Beers along with future Toronto Maple Leafs General Manager, Dave Nonis. He enjoyed a decorated college career, earning First-Team All-American honors in his junior year. His 32 goals remains the most ever by a Black Bear defenseman.

Capuano turned pro in 1988 following his junior year and signed with the Maple Leafs. He spent his first season with the Newmarket Saints of the AHL recording 21 points in 74 games. He would crack the Leafs' NHL roster for the 1989–90 season, but played in only 1 game before Tom Kurvers returned from a holdout, forcing his demotion. Shortly after his demotion, he walked out on the Saints and demanded a trade, feeling he belonged in the NHL.

Toronto would deal Capuano to the New York Islanders mid-season, but they too assigned him to the AHL. He played only 17 games in the Islanders' system before being dealt again, this time to the Vancouver Canucks.

Capuano would have his finest professional season in 1990–91, recording 20 goals and 50 points and earning 2nd-team All-Star honors in the IHL playing for the Milwaukee Admirals, Vancouver's minor-pro affiliate. He received a three-game callup to the Canucks, where he received the opportunity to play with his brother Dave. The two became the first pair of brothers in Canucks history to suit up for the team at the same time.

Capuano signed as a free agent with the Boston Bruins for the 1991–92 season. He enjoyed another solid season in the AHL, and another two games of NHL action with the Bruins, but chose to retire at the end of the season. He finished his career having appeared in 6 NHL games without recording a point.

Coaching career
Following his career as a player, Capuano moved into coaching. He served as an assistant coach with the Tallahassee Tiger Sharks of the ECHL before being hired as head coach of the  ECHL's Pee Dee Pride in 1997 and added the GM title to his responsibilities a year later. He left the bench in 1999 but continued as GM until 2005, when the franchise folded.

Capuano then signed on to be an assistant coach for the New York Islanders in the 2005–06 season. The team played fairly well, despite a midseason coaching change, but failed to make the playoffs. The following season, 2006–07, Capuano became an assistant coach for the Islanders' AHL affiliate, the Bridgeport Sound Tigers.  On April 30, 2007, Capuano was named head coach of the Sound Tigers for the 2007–2008 season.

On November 15, 2010, Capuano was named interim head coach of the Islanders after head coach Scott Gordon was fired from that position by GM Garth Snow amidst a 10-game losing streak by the team. The Islanders retained Capuano as the full-time coach for the 2011–12 season. Capuano led the Islanders to a playoff spot in 2013, their first appearance in six years.

On April 27, 2016, Capuano was hit by a puck during a playoff game between the New York Islanders and Tampa Bay Lightning.

On January 17, 2017, Capuano was relieved from his duties as the head coach by the Islanders.

In 2017-18 and 2018-19, Capuano served as associate coach for Florida Panthers 

On June 6, 2019, Capuano was named associate coach of the Ottawa Senators.

Career statistics

Regular season and playoffs

NHL coaching statistics

Awards and honours

 Holds Maine Black Bears record for career goals by a defenseman (32, 1985–88)
 IHL Second All-Star Team (1990–91)
 Coached Team USA/World in ECHL All-Star Game

References

External links

Profile at hockeydraftcentral.com

1966 births
Living people
AHCA Division I men's ice hockey All-Americans
American expatriate ice hockey people in Canada
American ice hockey coaches
American men's ice hockey defensemen
Boston Bruins players
Florida Panthers coaches
Ice hockey coaches from Rhode Island
Kent School alumni
Maine Black Bears men's ice hockey players
Maine Mariners players
Milwaukee Admirals (IHL) players
Newmarket Saints players
New York Islanders coaches
Sportspeople from Cranston, Rhode Island
Springfield Indians players
Toronto Maple Leafs draft picks
Toronto Maple Leafs players
United States men's national ice hockey team coaches
Vancouver Canucks players
Ice hockey players from Rhode Island